The Daifang Commandery was an administrative division established by the Chinese Han dynasty on the Korean Peninsula between 204 and 314.

History 
Gongsun Kang, a warlord in Liaodong, separated the southern half from the Lelang commandery and established the Daifang commandery in 204 to make administration more efficient. He controlled southern natives with Daifang instead of Lelang.

In 236 under the order of Emperor Ming of Cao Wei, Sima Yi defeated the Gongsun family and annexed Liaodong, Lelang and Daifang to Wei. A dispute over the control of southern natives caused their revolt. The armies of Lelang and Daifang eventually stifled it.

Daifang Commandery was inherited by the Jin dynasty. Due to the bitter civil War of the Eight Princes, Jin became unable to control the Korean peninsula at the beginning of the 4th century. Zhang Tong (張統) broke away from Jin in Lelang and Daifang. After Luoyang, the capital of Jin, was occupied by the Xiongnu in 311, he went for help to Murong Hui, a Xianbei warlord, with his subjects in 314. Goguryeo under King Micheon annexed Lelang and Daifang soon after that.

Area 
The Daifang Commandery was located around Hwanghae and its capital was Daifang County. However, the controversy over its location is not resolved yet. According to a Chinese official chronicle, the Book of Jin (晉書), it had the following seven counties (縣, xian):

Daifang (帶方)
Liekou (列口)
Nanxin (南新)
Changcen (長岑)
Tixi (提奚)
Hanzi (含資)
Haiming (海冥)

Maps

See also 
 Xuantu Commandery
 Lelang Commandery
 Zhenfan Commandery
 Lintun Commandery
 Canghai Commandery
 Three Kingdoms
 Records of Three Kingdoms

References 
Nahm, Andrew C. (1988).  Korea: Tradition and Transformation - A History of the Korean People. Elizabeth, NJ: Hollym International.

Early Korean history
Commanderies of the Han dynasty
Commanderies of the Jin dynasty (266–420)
Former commanderies of China in Korea
Four Commanderies of Han